EgyptAir Flight 864 was a flight from Rome Fiumicino Airport to Tokyo International Airport, via Cairo, Bombay, and Bangkok. On 25 December 1976, the Boeing 707 crashed into an industrial complex in Bangkok. All 52 people on board were killed, plus 19 on the ground in the crash.

Aircraft 
The aircraft was a Boeing 707-366C with the serial number 20763 and serial 871, that had its maiden flight on 25 August 1973. The aircraft was registered as SU-AXA and was delivered to EgyptAir, and entered service on 20 September the same year. The aircraft was powered by Pratt & Whitney JT3D-7 turbofan engines.

Accident 
Flight 864 was a regularly scheduled international passenger flight from Rome to Tokyo with stopovers in Cairo, Bombay and Bangkok. With 9 crew members and 43 passengers on board, flight 864 approached Bangkok. Having received the radar vector to the "BK" DPRM, the crew began their approach to runway 21L. The crew reported their observations. The controller cleared the flight to land, and the crew acknowledged the transmission. The aircraft exploded on impact, and all 52 people on board were killed. The weaving mill was also destroyed, with 19 people killed on the ground. The total number of victims was 71 people. At that time, the crash was the deadliest aviation disaster to occur in Thailand (it is now the sixth).

Cause 
Pilot error was determined to be the cause of the crash. EgyptAir claimed that the Bangkok control tower had provided inadequate weather information to the crew of Flight 864. The crew had also reduced the aircraft's vertical speed and did not monitor its height properly.

References 

Airliner accidents and incidents involving controlled flight into terrain
Accidents and incidents involving the Boeing 707
Aviation accidents and incidents in Thailand
Aviation accidents and incidents in 1976
864
1976 in Thailand
December 1976 events in Asia
History of Bangkok
Airliner accidents and incidents caused by pilot error